Montford M. "Tubby" McIntire (September 30, 1884 – January 10, 1963) was an American football coach He was the 17th head football coach at West Virginia University  in Morgantown, West Virginia, serving for four seasons, from 1916 to 1920, and compiling a record of 24–11–4 West Virginia did not field a team in 1918 due to World War I.

McIntire was the head football coach at Phillips University in Enid, Oklahoma from 1921 to 1923. He resigned following the 1923 season and intended to return to his home state of West Virginia.

McIntire died in 1963 of coronary thrombosis.

Head coaching record

References

External links
 

1884 births
1963 deaths
American football tackles
Phillips Haymakers football coaches
West Virginia Mountaineers football coaches
West Virginia Mountaineers football players
West Virginia Wesleyan Bobcats football coaches
People from New Martinsville, West Virginia
Players of American football from  West Virginia
Sportspeople from Enid, Oklahoma